William Gregory Rothman (born December 10, 1966) is an American politician. A Republican, he is currently the state senator for Pennsylvania's 34th District, and previously a member of the Pennsylvania House of Representatives from 2015 to 2022, representing the 87th District.

Early life, education, and real estate career
Rothman was born on December 10, 1966, in Harrisburg, Pennsylvania. He graduated from Cumberland Valley High School in 1985, received a B.S. in political science from the University of Massachusetts, Amherst in 1989, and an M.S. in real estate from Johns Hopkins University in 2005. He served in the Marine Corps Reserves.

In 1991, Rothman pled guilty to the misdemeanor charge of conspiracy to commit forgery. The conviction was later expunged, and Governor Ed Rendell issued Rothman a pardon in January 2011. In 2015, Rothman said that he had learned from his mistake and took responsibility for it.

Rothman spent several decades in the real estate business. He was a real estate agent and then CEO of RSR Realtors, a real estate company based in Lemoyne.  Rothman was also part owner of the Harrisburg Senators minor league baseball team.

Political career
Rothman was chair of the Bush-Cheney 2004 re-election campaign in Cumberland County, Pennsylvania. He was a volunteer aide on the Rick Santorum's 2012 presidential campaign, often appearing in Santorum's entourage.

Pennsylvania House of Representatives
In August 2015, Rothman was elected to the Pennsylvania House of Representatives in a special election to fill a vacancy in the 87th House district. The vacancy arose from the resignation of Glen Grell, who stepped down to become executive director of the Pennsylvania Public School Employees' Retirement System. The district included Camp Hill, East Pennsboro Township, and Hampden Township, as well as a part of Silver Spring Township; Rothman lives in Silver Spring Township. He was reelected in 2016, 2018, and 2020.

In 2016, Rothman was the chair of the Cumberland County Republican Party. He supported Donald Trump's 2016 presidential campaign, and was on Trump's team at the 2016 Republican National Convention arranging convention operations. He defended Republican Senator Pat Toomey from intra-party critics who asserted that Toomey was insufficiently pro-Trump.

In 2020, Rothman was chair of the House Republican Campaign Committee, leading the campaign efforts for the Pennsylvania House Republicans.

In 2019, Rothman sponsored legislation to shorten the time period for evictions in Pennsylvania. The bill was supported by landlords' organizations and opposed by tenant and low-income housing advocacy organizations. He supports a reduction in Pennsylvania's corporate net income tax and abolition of the state's inheritance tax. Rothman was the leading supporter of legislation, signed into law in 2019, that established 21 as the minimum age to purchase tobacco products, including e-cigarettes, except for active-duty military personnel and honorably discharged veterans, for which the minimum age remained 18. The exemption was criticized by tobacco control groups.

After Donald Trump was defeated by Joe Biden in the 2020 presidential election, Rothman was one of 26 Pennsylvania House Republicans who wrote a letter calling for the election to be overturned by withdrawing Pennsylvania's certification of its presidential electors, despite the fact that Biden won by over 80,000 votes in Pennsylvania. The group of Republicans erroneously claimed that the election was marred by fraud. The letter came after Trump's campaign lost multiple court cases due to lack of evidence.

In 2021, as part of Republican efforts to restrict voting following the 2020 presidential election, Rothman supported a bill to rewrite Pennsylvania's election laws by requiring voter ID. Governor Tom Wolf vetoed the bill.

Pennsylvania State Senate
In 2022, Rothman was elected to represent the 34th District in the Pennsylvania State Senate.

References

External links
Official campaign website
Official Pennsylvania House of Representatives profile

Living people
People from Cumberland County, Pennsylvania
Republican Party members of the Pennsylvania House of Representatives
21st-century American politicians
1968 births
Republican Party Pennsylvania state senators